{{Infobox person
| name         = Jeff Brazier
| image        = 
| birth_name   = Jeffrey Carl Brazier
| birth_date   = 
| birth_place  = Tiptree, Essex, England
| years_active = 2001–present
| occupation   = Television presenter
| children     = 2, including Bobby Brazier
| partner     = Jade Goody (2002-2004)
| spouse       = 
| father       = Stephen Faldo
| known_for    = 'BT SportThis MorningLoose Women| module       = 
}} 
Jeffrey Carl Brazier (born 27 May 1979) is an English television personality and presenter.

Early life and education
Brazier was brought up in Tiptree, near Colchester in Essex, and attended Thurstable School, a mixed state comprehensive school in his home town.

Career

Television
In 2001, Brazier took part in the Channel 4 reality television show Shipwrecked, in which he and fifteen other people had to stay on a tropical island without any creature comforts. After this, Brazier took part in the ITV programme Simply the Best, as well as presenting the TV programmes Dirty Laundry and Big Brother Panto with June Sarpong.

In 2003, Brazier appeared in Celebrity Wife Swap with then-girlfriend Jade Goody, opposite Charles Ingram. In September 2004, Brazier won the Channel 5 reality TV show The Farm and also appeared in the Living TV programme I'm Famous and Frightened!.

Brazier hosted The X Factor Live Tour in venues all over the United Kingdom and Ireland from 2005 to 2010.

In 2006, Brazier presented the revival of the CITV programme Finders Keepers. Brazier was a panellist on the now defunct ITV talk show Loose @5.30!, a spin-off of Loose Women and has also appeared in The Match and Celebrity Soccer Six on Sky1, where he played for England, as well as appearing on Call Me a Cabbie with Carol Thatcher and Janet Street Porter. Brazier has also been a This Morning "showbiz" presenter.

In November 2006, Brazier joined the presenting team of ITV2's I'm a Celebrity...Get Me Out of Here! NOW! with Kelly Osbourne in Australia and Mark Durden-Smith hosting at the London Studios. On 16 December 2006, Brazier was a guest reporter on The X Factor final live from contestant Ray Quinn's home town of Liverpool, and live from contestants Same Difference's home town of Portsmouth on 15 December 2007. He was the guest reporter at JLS's home town on 13 December 2008 and at Stacey Solomon's home town of Dagenham on 12 December 2009.

In 2010, Brazier was a celebrity guest team captain on What Do Kids Know? with Rufus Hound, Joe Swash and Sara Cox on Watch, and on 17 December 2010, Brazier presented a documentary, My Brother and Me, which was broadcast on BBC Three. From August until December 2011, Brazier co-presented OK! TV on Channel 5 with Jenny Frost.

Brazier is a guest presenter for ITV lifestyle show Sunday Scoop and also has regular stints on the daytime series This Morning (TV programme). Brazier is also an ambassador for People's Postcode Lottery 

Guest appearancesCelebrity Total Wipeout (18 September 2010) – ContestantMongrels (2010) – Guest appearanceLoose Women (17 May 2011, 30 March 2012) – GuestDaybreak (2 March 2012) – GuestTipping Point: Lucky Stars (16 August 2014) – ContestantCelebrity SAS: Who Dares Wins (2019) – Contestant
Celebrity Masterchef (2020) – Contestant

Dancing on Ice

From 9 January to 13 March 2011, Brazier participated in the sixth series of the ice skating show Dancing on Ice, with professional female Canadian ice skater Isabelle Gauthier. He was in the bottom two three times: in week two against cricketer Dominic Cork, and in week five against Kerry Katona. In week 10, Brazier and Gauthier were eliminated after the judges votes to save Sam Attwater and his skating partner Brianne Delcourt.

Writing
Brazier writes a column in the Daily Mirror on a weekly basis.

Personal life
Brazier's father, Stephen Faldo, was the skipper of the pleasure boat Marchioness, which sank on the River Thames in 1989 after being hit by a dredger, killing him as well as 50 others.

Brazier has two sons from his relationship with Big Brother contestant Jade Goody: Bobby Jack (b. 2003) and Freddy (b. 2004). In 2022, Bobby was announced to be joining the cast of EastEnders'' as Freddie Slater.

On 1 October 2017, Brazier got engaged to his girlfriend Kate Dwyer. The couple married in Portugal on 15 September 2018.

References

External links
https://jeff-brazier.com/
https://www.instagram.com/jeffbrazier
https://twitter.com/JeffBrazier
https://behindsport.com/industry-insider-jeff-brazier/

1979 births
Living people
English footballers
English television personalities
English television presenters
English radio presenters
English podcasters
Leyton Orient F.C. players
Grays Athletic F.C. players
Billericay Town F.C. players
Canvey Island F.C. players
Boreham Wood F.C. players
Association football defenders